Alberto José Armando (February 4, 1910 – December 28, 1988) was an Argentine businessman and football manager. He was the president of club Boca Juniors from 1954 to 1955, and from 1960 to 1980. With Armando as president, Boca Juniors gained international recognition after winning its first Copa Libertadores (1977 and 1978) and the first Intercontinental Cup in 1977.

The Boca Juniors stadium was renamed in his honour in December 2000 by then President Mauricio Macri.

Life and career
Armando was born in Santa Fe, Argentina, in 1910, and raised in nearby San Francisco, Córdoba. He married María Mercedes Crespo and became affiliated with the Boca Juniors football club in the 1940s, when he became known as El Puma. Armando was elected president of Boca Juniors in early 1954, succeeding Daniel Gil. The team had struggled since its last First Division title, in 1944, though Gil's tenure could boast the enlargement and modernization of the La Bombonera stadium.

Armando's brief first turn as president during 1954–55 was marked by the team's first title in a decade, the 1954 Primera División championship. However, his occupation as the proprietor of a Ford dealership prompted him to resign. He diversified his business interests in 1960, when he entered into a partnership with developer Francisco Macri to establish Tutora Insurance.

Later in 1960, Armando won the election and returned as president of Boca Juniors. He undertook an ambitious program of acquiring new players. Some of them would become notable footballers in the 1960s and 1970s, such as Antonio Roma, Silvio Marzolini, Ernesto Grillo, Dante Lugo, and Antonio Garabal (the latter three were Argentine expatriates brought back from European teams). The squad victory over arch-rival River Plate in 1962 was the first major title since 1954, and was followed by the 1964 and 1965, and the Nacional championships in 1969, 1970, and 1976, totalizing 7 league titles.

Armando was also the father of the Torneos de Verano, a series of short friendly pre-season tournaments held during the southern summer in Argentina every year, usually in January and February. The competition was held for the first time in 1968, with the games played at "General San martín" stadium of Mar del Plata, the biggest seaside beach resort in Argentina. Since the first edition in 1968, the Torneos de Verano have been uninterruptedly played, then being expanded to other cities of Argentina such as Córdoba, Mendoza, Rosario and Tandil among others.

Armando's administration in Boca Juniors also invested heavily in improving facilities. La Bombonera was modernized, and bucket seats were added. A 5-hectare (13 acre) property in suburban San Justo, Buenos Aires, was purchased in 1963 for use as La Candela, the team's training grounds. An aging football field was leased in Mar del Plata in 1969 for additional use during the summer months, when weather in the Buenos Aires area is least propitious for training.

Armando's ambitious works program also included plans for a new stadium, for which the Argentine Congress passed a bill in 1965 donating a  waterfront lot south of the Costanera Sur (the abandoned former municipal beach along the Río de la Plata in what today is the tony Puerto Madero ward). He lobbied successfully for the concession by presenting plans for a new, 140,000 seat stadium, as well as other improvements, notably a sports complex. Construction began on the mammoth Ciudad Deportiva project, and a recreational area consisting of a network of round islands connected by bridges was completed. Ultimately, however, the stadium was never built, and much of the land earmarked for the sports complex was leased to private installations, notably a restaurant and a drive-in cinema.

These setbacks were accompanied by a dearth in new titles for the team lasting from 1971 to 1975. The hiring of Juan Carlos Lorenzo as head coach, however, helped revert the rut, and a national title in 1976 was followed by the team's first international title, the 1977 Copa Intercontinental. This was followed by Copa Libertadores de América titles in 1977 and 1978.

The Ciudad Deportiva project continued to burden the team's finances, and in 1979, Mayor Osvaldo Cacciatore declared Boca Juniors to be in non-compliance with the 1965 deed. Following negotiations, the mayor relieved the team from nearly all further construction obligations, and in 1980 Armando retired.

His successor, Martín Noel, stopped all new construction on the project, and the rapid deterioration in the team's finances after 1981 ultimately led Antonio Alegre, the team president elected in 1985, to sell the land as a means of rescuing Boca Juniors from bankruptcy. Armando, who objected to the sale, challenged Alegre in a December 1986 team election, losing narrowly; he died on December 28, 1988.
 
Mauricio Macri, who was elected president of the club in 1995, and whose father was Armando's erstwhile business partner (Francisco Macri), renamed La Bombonera (officially known as the "Camilo Cichero" Stadium until then) in honor of former club president Alberto J. Armando.

References

1910 births
1988 deaths
People from Santa Fe, Argentina
20th-century Argentine businesspeople
Chairmen of Boca Juniors